The Macedonian Muslims, also known as Muslim Macedonians or Torbeši, and in some sources grouped together with Pomaks, are a minority religious group within the community of ethnic Macedonians who are Sunni Muslims (with Sufi influences being widespread among the population). They have been culturally distinct from the majority Orthodox Christian Macedonian community for centuries, and are ethnically and linguistically distinct from the larger Muslim ethnic groups in the greater region of Macedonia: the Albanians, Turks and Romanis. However, some Torbeši also still maintain a strong affiliation with Turkish identity and with Macedonian Turks. The regions inhabited by these Macedonian-speaking Muslims are Debarska Župa, Poreče (Suva Gora), Dolni Drimkol (particularly enclosing the villages of Oktisi and Labuništa), Reka, and Golo Brdo (in Albania).

Origins
The Macedonian Muslims are largely the descendants of Orthodox Christian Slavs from the region of Macedonia who were converted to Islam during the centuries when the Ottoman Empire ruled the Balkans. The various Sufi orders (like the Khalwati, Rifa'is and Qadiris) all played a role in the conversion of the Slavic and Paulician population.

Areas of settlement

The largest concentration of Macedonian Muslims can be found in western North Macedonia and eastern Albania. Most of the villages in Debar regions are populated by Macedonian Muslims. The Struga municipality also holds a large number of Macedonian Muslims who are primarily concentrated in the large village of  Labuništa. Further north in the Debar region many of the surrounding villages are inhabited by Macedonian Muslims. The Dolna Reka region is also primarily populated by Macedonian Muslims. They form the remainder of the population which emigrated to Turkey in the 1950s and 1960s. Places such as Rostuša and Tetovo also have large Macedonian Muslim populations. Most of the Turkish population along the western Macedonian border are in fact Macedonian Muslims. Another large concentration of Macedonian Muslims is in the so-called Torbešija which is just south of Skopje. There are also major concentrations of Macedonian Muslims in the central region of North Macedonia, surrounding the Plasnica municipality and the Dolneni municipality.

Demographics
The exact numbers of Macedonian Muslims are not easy to establish.  The historian Ivo Banac estimates that in the old Kingdom of Yugoslavia, before World War II, the Macedonian Muslim population stood at around 27,000. Subsequent censuses have produced dramatically varying figures: 1,591 in 1953, 3,002 in 1961, 1,248 in 1971 and 39,355 in 1981. Commentators have suggested that the latter figure includes many who previously identified themselves as Turks. Meanwhile, the Association of Macedonian Muslims has claimed that since World War II more than 70,000 Macedonian Muslims have been assimilated by other Muslim groups, most notably the Albanians. It can be estimated that the Macedonian Muslim population in North Macedonia in the year 2013 is 40.000 people.

Language and ethnic affiliation
Like their Christian ethnic kin, Macedonian Muslims speak the Macedonian language as their first language. Despite their common language and racial heritage, it is almost unheard of for Macedonian Muslims to intermarry with Macedonian Orthodox Christians. Macedonian ethnologists do not consider the Muslim Macedonians a separate ethnic group from the Christian Macedonians, but instead a religious minority within the Macedonian ethnic community. Intermarriage with the country's other Muslim groups (Bosniaks, Goranci, Albanians and Turks) are much more accepted, given the bonds of a common religion and history.

When the Socialist Republic of Macedonia was established in 1944, the Yugoslav government encouraged the Macedonian Muslims to adopt an ethnic Macedonian identity. This has since led to some tensions with the Macedonian Christian community over the widespread association between Macedonian national identity and adherence to the Macedonian Orthodox Church.

Political activities
The principal outlet for Macedonian Muslim political activities has been the Association of Macedonian Muslims. It was established in 1970 with the support of the authorities, probably as a means of keeping Macedonian Muslim aspirations in control.

The fear of assimilation into the Albanian Muslim community has been a significant factor in Macedonian Muslim politics, amplified by the tendency of some Macedonian Muslims to vote for Albanian candidates. In 1990, the chairman of the Macedonian Muslims organization, Riza Memedovski, sent an open letter to the Chairman of the Party for Democratic Prosperity of Macedonia, accusing the party of using religion to promote the Albanisation of the Macedonian Muslims. A controversy broke out in 1995 when the Albanian-dominated Meshihat or council of the Islamic community in North Macedonia declared that Albanian was the official language of Muslims in Macedonia. The decision prompted protests from the leaders and members of the Macedonian Muslim community.

Occupation
Many Macedonian Muslims are involved in agriculture, and also work abroad.  Macedonian Muslims are well known as fresco-painters, wood carvers and mosaic-makers. In the past few decades large numbers of Macedonian Muslims have emigrated to Western Europe and North America.

Notable people

Jašar Ahmedovski, Macedonian and Serbian singer.
, Macedonian politician.
, Yugoslav religious leader, reis-ul ulema.
Amel Rustemoski, Macedonian footballer.
Emir Saitoski, Macedonian footballer.
Selmin Sakiri, Macedonian engineer.
Menil Velioski, Macedonian singer

Gallery

See also
 Macedonians (ethnic group)
 Greek Muslims
 Muslim Bulgarians and Pomaks
 Gorani
 Islam in North Macedonia

References

External links
  
 Muslims of Macedonia

 
Ethnic groups in North Macedonia
Islam in North Macedonia
Muslim communities in Europe
Slavic ethnic groups